Queen Mary's Dolls' House is a dollhouse built in the early 1920s, completed in 1924, for Queen Mary, the wife of King George V. It was designed by architect Sir Edwin Lutyens, with contributions from many notable artists and craftsmen of the period, including a library of miniature books containing original stories written by authors including Sir Arthur Conan Doyle and A. A. Milne.

History
The idea for building the dollhouse originally came from the Queen's cousin, Princess Marie Louise, who discussed her idea with one of the top architects of the time, Sir Edwin Lutyens, at the Royal Academy Summer Exhibition of 1921.  Sir Edwin agreed to construct the dollhouse and began preparations. Princess Marie Louise had many connections in the arts and arranged for the top artists and craftsmen of the time to contribute their special abilities to the house. It was created as a gift to Queen Mary from the people, and to serve as a historical document on how a royal family might have lived during that period in England.

It showcased the very finest and most modern goods of the period. Later the dollhouse was put on display to raise funds for the Queen's charities. It was originally exhibited at the British Empire Exhibition, 1924–1925, where more than 1.6 million people came to view it, and is now on display in Windsor Castle, at Windsor, Berkshire, England, as a tourist attraction.

Description

The dollhouse was made to a scale of 1:12 (one inch to one foot), is over three feet tall, and contains models of products of well-known companies of the time. It is remarkable for its detail and the detail of the objects within it, many of which are -sized replicas of items in Windsor Castle. These were either made by the companies themselves, or by specialist modelmakers, such as Twining Models of Northampton, England. The carpets, curtains and furnishings are all copies of the real thing, and the house has working light fittings.  The bathrooms are fully plumbed with piped, running water, and include a flushable toilet with miniature lavatory paper. Other items in the house include shotguns that "break and load", monogrammed linens, lifts and a garage of cars with operational engines.

In addition, well-known writers wrote special books for the house's library, which were bound in scale size by Sangorski & Sutcliffe. Sir Arthur Conan Doyle contributed the short story "How Watson Learned the Trick", and the ghost-story writer M. R. James wrote "The Haunted Dolls' House". A. A. Milne contributed "Vespers". Other authors included J. M. Barrie, Thomas Hardy, Rudyard Kipling and W. Somerset Maugham. (George Bernard Shaw rebuffed the princess's request for a tiny volume of his work.) Composers who contributed miniature works for the house included Gustav Holst, Frederick Delius, Arthur Bliss, John Ireland and Arnold Bax, although Sir Edward Elgar refused to contribute.

Painters, including Eli Marsden Wilson, Edith Mary Hinchley and Gladys Kathleen Bell, also provided miniature pictures. Two pen-and-ink drawings by G. Howell-Baker were supplied by his sister, who wrote to say that he had recently died when the request for his contribution arrived from the palace.

Even the bottles in the wine cellar were filled with the appropriate wines and spirits, and the wheels of motor vehicles were properly spoked. Queen Mary's purchases brought media attention to specialist furnishers such as Dorothy Rogers, who created needlework miniature carpets for the house. Even viewing a high quality photo of the interior will not reveal it is in fact a collection of miniatures.

There is a hidden garden revealed only when a vast drawer is pulled out from beneath the main building. Designed by Gertrude Jekyll, it includes replicas of greenery and garden implements and follows a traditional ornamental garden theme.

Reproductions 

The ceramics company Cauldon China produced a Parian ware box modelled on the house, measuring 9.5×15 cm, and 12.5 cm high, at around the time of the 1924 exhibition. A version was also produced with the exhibition's crest applied as a colour transfer, in the manner of crested ware. Some of the proceeds were donated to Queen Mary's charities.

See also
 Astolat Dollhouse Castle
 Colleen Moore Dollhouse

Notes and references

Further reading
Ryu, Jiyi (2018). "The Queen's Dolls' House within the British Empire Exhibition: Encapsulating the British Imperial World". Contemporary British History, vol. 33, no. 4, pp. 464–482. 
Stewart-Wilson, Mary (1988). Queen Mary's Dolls' House. London: Bodley Head.

External links

 The Royal Collection: Queen Mary's Dolls' House
 Pictures of the dollhouse

1920s toys
1924 works
British monarchy
Tourist attractions in Berkshire
Windsor Castle
Dollhouses
Works of Edwin Lutyens
Mary of Teck